is a regular-footed Japanese professional street skateboarder. Nishimura represented Japan in the women's street event at the  2020 Olympic Games in Tokyo.

Biography 
Born in Edogawa, Tokyo in Japan, Aori Nishimura started skating at the age of 7, in 2008.

She made her professional debut when she was in fifth grade in a tournament organized by the All-Japan Skateboarding Association.

Professional skateboarding 
In 2017, Nishimura won the Japan National Skateboarding Championship. Furthermore, she was the first athlete from Japan to win gold at the X Games Minneapolis 2017 extreme sports event held in Minneapolis.

In October 2017, three months after her victory, Nishimura suffered an ACL injury in her left knee for which she had to undergo reconstructive ligament surgery and temporarily move away from skateboarding. After six months of rehabilitation, she returned to training in June 2018 and returned to competitions in July 2018.

She was invited to the Dew Tour Long Beach tournament, where she was eighth among the eight participants. On that occasion she expressed her dissatisfaction with the results obtained; however, that same month, she would achieve an evolution and take the silver medal in the X Games Minneapolis 2018, where Mariah Duran took first place.

In January 2019, in Rio de Janeiro, Brazil, she was crowned world skateboarding champion in the World Skateboarding Championship, which was jointly organized by World Skate and Street League Skateboarding (SLS). Nishimura eclipsed hometown favorite, Letícia Bufoni, who won the silver medal.

Nishimura appears as one of the new playable skateboarders in the 2020 game Tony Hawk's Pro Skater 1 + 2.

Awards 

 Bronze medal - World Skateboarding Championship (São Paulo, 2019)
Gold Medal - X Games Norway (2019)
 Gold Medal - X Games Minneapolis (2019)
 Women's world champion of street skateboarding (Street League Skateboarding Tournament, Rio, 2018)
 Silver Medal - X Games Minneapolis 2018
 Bronze Medal - X Games Sydney - (2018)
 Japanese Street Skateboarding Champion (2017)
 Gold Medal - X Games Minneapolis 2017

Personal life 
Aori has two sisters, who are also dedicated to skateboarding: Sana and Kotone.

On 21 November 2020, she confirmed that she and Brazilian professional skateboarder Lucas Rabelo, from the Flip Skateboards Pro Team, had been dating for a year. The couple has been together since November 2019.

References

External links 
 
 Aori Nishimura at The Boardr

 Meet Japanese prodigy Aori Nishimura at Olympic Channel (Video)

Living people
2001 births
Female skateboarders
Japanese skateboarders
Japanese sportswomen
Olympic skateboarders of Japan
Skateboarders at the 2020 Summer Olympics
X Games athletes
21st-century Japanese women